Kissing Cup's Race may refer to:

 Kissing Cup's Race (poem), a poem by Campbell Rae Brown
 Kissing Cup's Race (1920 film), British silent film directed by Walter West
 Kissing Cup's Race (1930 film), British sound film directed by Castleton Knight

See also
 Kissing Cup, a 1913 film
 Son of Kissing Cup, a 1922 film